TCPy or 3,5,6-trichloro-2-pyridinol is a cyclic hydrocarbon, specifically a chlorinated version of 2-pyridone.

Pesticides can be a precursor to TCPy. TCPy is a metabolite of the herbicide triclopyr, and of the insecticides chlorpyrifos and chlorpyrifos-methyl. A study in Massachusetts reported a correlation between exposure to TCPy and lower testosterone levels in men.  According to this source, exposure is "widespread" and of "potential public health importance".

References 

Chloroarenes
2-Pyridones